Mysore Ananthaswamy was one of the pioneers of Kannada Bhavageethe in Karnataka. He was a very popular  composer and singer of Kannada Sugama Sangeetha. He composed music for several poems and bhavageethe written by well-known Kannada poets like Kuvempu, K. S. Nissar Ahmed, N S Lakshminarayana Bhatta and others. Some of his songs includes 'Jogada Siri Belakinali', Jaya Bharata Jananiya Tanujate, O Nanna Chetana and Ede Tumbi Haadidenu. At a young age, Ananthaswamy played Mandolin that he purchased for 25 rupees. Later, he switched to Harmonium due to difficulty in fine tuning the Mandolin.

Ananthaswamy composed music to the state anthem of Karnataka, Jaya Bharata Jananiya Tanujate in 1960.  He once sang his composition in front of Kuvempu who is the writer of the anthem at Maharaja College in Mysore. A note in Ananthaswamy's diary says Kuvempu was delighted by his tune and approved his tune, adding a suggestion that it should be sung in a group. Several committees have recommended the tune composed by Ananthaswamy to be recognized as the official tune of the Karnataka state anthem.

Discography
This is a partial list of notable compositions by Mysore Ananthaswamy 

 Jaya Bharata Jananiya Tanujate
 Jogada Siri Belakinali
 Ede Tumbi Haadidenu
 O Nanna Chetana

Awards and honors
He was awarded with Karnataka Sangeeta Nritya Academy award and Rajyotsava Award.

Death
Mysore Ananthaswamy died of cancer on 9 January 1995 in Bengaluru.

References

Kannada people
Kannada playback singers
Singers from Mysore
1936 births
1995 deaths